Kankakee Township may refer to:
 Kankakee Township, Kankakee County, Illinois
 Kankakee Township, Jasper County, Indiana
 Kankakee Township, LaPorte County, Indiana

Township name disambiguation pages